Biharinath is the tallest hill of Bankura District, in the Indian state of West Bengal., and one of the dense forest areas of the district. It is a part of the Eastern Ghats.

Geography

Location

Area overview
The map alongside shows the Bankura Sadar subdivision of Bankura district. Physiographically, this area is part of the Bankura Uplands in the west gradually merging with the Bankura-Bishnupur Rarh Plains in the north-east. The western portions are characterised by undulating terrain with many hills and ridges. The area is having a gradual descent from the Chota Nagpur Plateau. The soil is laterite red and hard beds are covered with scrub jungle and sal wood. Gradually it gives way to just uneven rolling lands but the soil continues to be lateritic. There are coal mines in the northern part, along the Damodar River. It is a predominantly rural area with 89% of the population living in rural areas and only 11% living in the urban areas.

Note: The map alongside presents some of the notable locations in the subdivision. All places marked in the map are linked in the larger full screen map.

Archaeological importance
With the discovery of Paleolithic tools in the Biharinath area, the hill and the surrounding areas have come into focus of archaeologists.

Tourism

The base of Biharinath hill is a popular tourist spot. A small tank measuring 0.50 ha provides facilities for angling. There is an old Shiva temple of Biharinath nearby.

Biharinath offers a pollution-free green surroundings where water is panacea. This place has hills, dense forests with abundant flora and fauna, spring, water bodies, Damodar River, and a renowned Shiva temple. Susunia hill, Joychandi Pahar, Garh Panchkot, Baranti, Panchet Dam, and Maithon Dam are all located at short distances. Government of West Bengal has already taken a 150 crore mega tourism project for Biharinath.

Economy
The area also has coal deposits. Biharinath block represents south central part of Raniganj Coalfield in Trans Damodar region. The entire area is covered with alluvial soil. People here are mostly dependent on coal mines or visit Asansol/Durgapur area to find a job. After tourism is flourishing at Biharinath people here is getting tourism related job gradually.

References

External links

Hills of West Bengal
Bankura district
Tourist attractions in Bankura district